Theory of Computing is a peer-reviewed open access scientific journal covering theoretical computer science. The journal was established in 2005 and is published by the Department of Computer Science of the University of Chicago. The editor-in-chief is László Babai (University of Chicago).

External links
 

Publications established in 2005
Creative Commons Attribution-licensed journals
Computer science journals
University of Chicago